Karel Bártů (22 September 1916 – 25 July 2008) was a Czech modern pentathlete who competed in the 1948 Summer Olympics. After retiring from competition he became a coach, training the Czechoslovak modern pentathlon team, including his son Jan Bártů.

References

1916 births
2008 deaths
Czech male modern pentathletes
Olympic modern pentathletes of Czechoslovakia
Czechoslovak male modern pentathletes
Modern pentathletes at the 1948 Summer Olympics
Czech sports coaches